Oz Ifrah (born 10 December 1982) is an Israeli footballer currently playing for Maccabi Sh'aarayim.

Honours
Israel State Cup (1):
2013

External links

1982 births
Living people
Israeli Jews
Israeli footballers
Maccabi Tel Aviv F.C. players
Hapoel Be'er Sheva F.C. players
FC Torpedo Moscow players
Maccabi Herzliya F.C. players
Hapoel Ramat Gan F.C. players
Hapoel Ashkelon F.C. players
Hapoel Herzliya F.C. players
Hapoel Marmorek F.C. players
Maccabi Yavne F.C. players
Maccabi Sha'arayim F.C. players
Israeli Premier League players
Liga Leumit players
Expatriate footballers in Russia
Israeli expatriate sportspeople in Russia
Israeli people of Moroccan-Jewish descent
Footballers from Beersheba
Association football central defenders